Guy Forget and Yannick Noah were the defending champions and successfully defended their title, by defeating Miloslav Mečíř and Tomáš Šmíd 6–2, 6–7, 6–3 in the final.

Seeds

Draw

Finals

Top half

Bottom half

References

External links
 Official results archive (ATP)
 Official results archive (ITF)

1987 Italian Open (tennis)
Italian Open
Italian Open (Tennis), 1987
Italian Open